Henry "Harry" Swift was an English professional association footballer who played as a centre half.

References
 

People from Accrington
English footballers
Association football defenders
Accrington Stanley F.C. (1891) players
Burnley F.C. players
Third Lanark A.C. players
English Football League players
Scottish Football League players
19th-century births
20th-century deaths